Expeditie Robinson 2019 is the twentieth season of the Dutch version of the Swedish television series Expedition Robinson. This season is the first season since Expeditie Robinson 2016 to feature celebrities only. Twenty Dutch celebrities participate to win €25,000 and win the title of Robinson 2019. This is also the first season to be hosted by former contestant Kaj Gorgels who took over co-hosting the series from Dennis Weening. The season premiered on 1 September 2019. Two former winners, Carlos Platier Luna, winner of Expeditie Robinson 2017, and Fatima Moreira de Melo, winner of Expeditie Robinson 2012, returned in the first episode to celebrate the 20th anniversary of Expeditie Robinson.

For the first time ever, the finale had to be postponed. When, on day 32, Hugo and Eva were already out of bullets in the final part of the challenge, Shary-An, who was two stages behind, was eliminated and Hugo and Eva had to do a shoot out to determine the winner. However, because of severe weather conditions, this shoot out had to be postponed to the next day, making this expedition last for 33 days instead of the initiated 32.

Finishing order

Future Appearances
Rob Geus returned to compete in Expeditie Robinson 2021. Mariana Verkerk and Hugo Kennis returned to compete in Expeditie Robinson: All Stars.

References

External links

Expeditie Robinson seasons
2018 Dutch television seasons